Launch Complex 1  may refer to:

 Baikonur Cosmodrome Site 1, an active R-7 (Soyuz) launch pad at the Baikonur Cosmorome
 Cape Canaveral Air Force Station Launch Complex 1, a deactivated US Air Force launch site
 Kourou ELA-1, a former Ariane launch complex now used by Vega rockets
 Point Arguello Launch Complex 1, now part of Vandenberg AFB Space Launch Complex 3
 Rocket Lab Launch Complex 1, Mahia Spaceport, Ahuriri Point, Mahia Peninsula, North Island, New Zealand
 Satish Dhawan Space Centre First Launch Pad
 Taiyuan Launch Complex 1, a Long March launch complex at the Taiyuan Satellite Launch Centre
 Vandenberg Space Launch Complex 1, a former Thor launch complex at Vandenberg AFB
 Blue Origin Launch Site One, Corn Ranch, Van Horn, Texas, USA

See also

 SpaceX Landing Complex 1, Space Coast, Florida, USA
 Launch Complex (disambiguation)
 LC1 (disambiguation)